The Temple of the True Inner Light is a temple in Manhattan which believes Entheogens such as Dipropyltryptamine, THC, LSD-25, Mescaline, Psilocybin and DMT to be God, and that religions such as Christianity, Judaism, Buddhism, Hinduism, Islam, etc., originally believed that Entheogens are the true God. Their Eucharist is Dipropyltryptamine.

References

External links

 
American psychedelic drug advocates
Religious organizations using entheogens
Religion in New York City